Young Singh Hatyai United Football Club (Thai สโมสรฟุตบอลยังสิงห์ หาดใหญ่ ยูไนเต็ด), is a Thai professional football club based in Hatyai, Songkhla, Thailand. The club is currently playing in the Thai League 3 Southern region.

History
In 2017, the club has established as Hatyai City F.C. and competed in Thailand Amateur League Southern region. This club promoted to Thai League 4 (also known as Omsin League) since 2018 season, competed in the Southern region.

In 2019, the club still competed in Thai League 4 Southern region. And they move their ground to the Southern major city stadium.

In 2021, the club renamed to Young Singh Hatyai United F.C.

In 2023, Young Singh Hatyai United has been promoted from United Nations (UN) to be a member of the "Football for the Goals project", a project to support the global football community for sustainable development(SDGs 17), which Young Singh Hat Yai United is the only club in ASEAN that has been selected. And is in the project with the world's leading clubs such as Ajax Amsterdam (Netherlands), Al Nasser (Saudi Arabia), Penarol (Uruguay), Fortuna Dusseldorf. FC (Germany), Queens Park Rangers (England), etc.
UN - "Football For The Goal" Members

Stadium and locations

Season by season record

References

External links
 Club's info from Thai League official website
 Official Facebook page of Hatyai City Football Club

Association football clubs established in 2017
Football clubs in Thailand
Sport in Songkhla province
2017 establishments in Thailand